The Arab League or League of Arab States was founded by Egypt in 1945, has 22 members and seven observer members so far: Armenia, Brazil, Chad, Eritrea, Greece, Republic of India,  Venezuela.

The Arab League itself is an observer in several international and regional organizations, such as the Non-Aligned Movement, the African Union, the United Nations, and has observed several summits of ASEAN.

Members 

 Algeria
 Bahrain
 Comoros
 Djibouti
 Egypt
 Iraq
 Jordan
 Kuwait
 Lebanon
 Libya
 Mauritania
 Morocco
 Oman
 Palestine
 Qatar
 Saudi Arabia
 Somalia
 Sudan
 Syria (suspended)
 Tunisia
 United Arab Emirates
 Yemen

Multilateral relations

African Union 

Formal relations between the two organizations started in 1977, when they announced their cooperation in financial, political and economic issues. With a summit between both organizations in Cairo that same year, they have signed several treaties aimed at improving cooperation.

On 16 January 2008, the Arab League sent a Delegation to the AU Headquarters in Addis Ababa, Ethiopian Capital, to gain experience from the African Security and Peace Council, which has been in work since 2004, the Arab League's decision to create an Arab Peace and Security Council was taken following the 2006 Lebanon war, in a procedure to place Peace keeping forces into South Sudan, South Lebanon, and Ethiopian Peninsula, other regions such as Iraq and Iranians have not been announced or spoken of, since the Arab League's official Stance denounces any form of Foreign troops in Iraq, to maintain stability.

Eritrea 
In 2003, Eritrea the red sea country became the first Observer in the Pan-Arab Body, opening the door for it to become a prospect member in the League, while the Current Eritrean President has denied any plans for joining the League in the Near Future, due to its lack of efficiency.

ASEAN 

By January 2008 the AL and ASEAN had no significant relations, but the Arab League's Economic Council decided to Expand economic cooperation with Regional blocks, to benefit from their Economic experience and development, and started contacting the Association of South East Asian Nations (ASEAN), to build better relations and to increase investments from this region, and to learn from their Economic Achievements to be applied in the League.
which will help the Arab States to increase inner investments and inner imports and exports, the Head of the Delegation, also secretary General of the Arab Council for Economic Development (ACED), Dr. Ahmed Jweily to sign a treaty of understanding and cooperation Between the Two Organizations. The Delegation concluded the visit announcing that three New Arab Unions are to be proposed for the Council's 87th summit in its following Period.

European Union 

The Arab League and European Union have shared relations since the EU's development into a more political power rather than an economical one, in the 19th summit of the Arab League in Saudi Arabia, Javier Solana attended the summit, giving the EU's full support to the Arab League's Peace Initiative of 2002. Following this summit, he had several meetings with Palestinian President Mahmoud Abbas and the Arab League Secretary General Amr Moussa.
In the summit, he addressed the Arab Leaders, stating "Once again we find ourselves together, the European Union and the Arab League, once again we have an opportunity to re-affirm our joint commitment to the values of civilisation that we share, more than ever Europeans and Arabs have to face common challenges, I am confident that we will find new ways to improve our cooperation".

France 
France has been historically close with the Arab world, starting with the Maghreb region, and the Near East, but France's closest relations are considered to be with Algeria, where it served as a colony of France for around 132 years, with a bloody independence war, relations today are good, France is considered to have the Cordialest relations with All Arab states, with a large Arab population in France counting to around three million Arabs, France holds the Biggest Arab Cultural center outside the Arab league. The nation has had significant relations with Algeria, with Lebanon, and with Libya.

Latin America 

Relations between the Arab League and the Union of South American Nations (USAN), have only been established in recent times. The AL Secretary General Amr Moussa has stated that it was time for the Arab League and Latin America to seek strong relations. There are over 20 million Arabs living in Latin America, with Brazil containing over half of that number. As a result, President Luiz Inácio Lula da Silva was particularly vocal in efforts to improve relations.

The Arab-Latin American relations are concentrated mainly on Energy and Trade, strengthening ties between the two regions.
In May 2005, the first South American-Arab Countries Summit (ASPA) was held in Brazil, with 34 countries attending to discuss trade and energy.
Arab and Latin American economies are complementary. Latin America has developed high-tech skills and industries that will find ready markets in the Arab world as will its agricultural production. But Latin America is also energy-hungry and a ready market for Arab oil and downstream petrochemicals. They also have other common interests, not just a desire to see the elimination of the subsidies that allow European and American farmers to destroy the livelihoods of their counterparts elsewhere in the world. In an increasingly global economy, both want to avoid domination by the multinationals.

Yet the summit remained focused on politics rather than economics, with a joint call on Israel to dismantle settlements, concern about US sanctions against Syria, a call for UN reform, and Arab support for Argentina's position on the Falkland Islands. Developing business relations between the Arab world and South America will provide an invaluable balance to both regions' overdependence on Europe, the U.S. and Japan for imports and expertise.

Since many countries began to recognize Jerusalem as Israel's capital following Donald Trump's lead in 2017, many Latin American countries began to shift stance. When Guatemala recognized Jerusalem as the capital of Israel, the Arab League has cut ties with the country in 2018.

Brazil 
Brazil was admitted as an observer to the Arab League in 2002 or 2003. The country has a strong Arab heritage, with over 11 million inhabitants of Arabic descent, many of them from Lebanon. The first Summit of South American and Arab Countries (ASPA) was held in Brazil in May 2005, with 34 countries attending.

Venezuela 
Venezuela has a large Arab population from Syria, Lebanon and Palestine, has supported the Palestinian Cause, and is one of two Latin American countries to cut off ties with Israel (the other being Bolivia). It was granted observer status in the Arab League in 2006.

Bilateral relations

India 
Being conferred observer status in 2007, Republic of India was the first member to enter the League although it does not have yet that very big Arab community, neither does it have an indigenous Arabic speaking population. It does, however have a sizeable number of people claiming Arab descent. Trade between Republic of India and Arab League members was valued at US$30 billion in 2007. India's major exports to Arab League countries are chemicals, automobiles, machinery, foodstuff and other fast moving products, while it is a large importer of Arab oil and gas. Republic of India also has a large diaspora in the Arab League countries of about fifteen million, of which some 20% are professionals.

Oman and Republic of India enjoy particularly good relations, an example being; both countries exchange ship visits on a regular basis. Recently, Oman has granted India berthing rights for Indian naval ships. The Indian navy has also been training Omani naval forces for many years.

Qatar is the only other country in the Arab League, apart from Oman to have a significant military relationship with Republic of India. The pact guarantees State of Qatar of India intervention in case Qatar's interests are threatened. Naval officers from Qatar, like Oman train in India under the Indian Navy's institutes. India also has some military ties with Kuwait and the  UAE, primarily centered in the naval sphere, frequently exchanging goodwill naval visits. The UAE has been seeking India's assistance in setting up a submarine arm and hydgrographic survey and coastal zone management. In addition the UAE has evinced interest in training its naval personnel in India

Some Arab League members, namely the UAE have also voiced their support pertaining to deploying Indian troops in Iraq, although New Delhi has not decided on this matter. Some Arab League members have also voiced its support for India to be conferred a permanent seat on the UN Security Council. India was among the first countries to recognize Palestine when it was proclaimed in November 1988. In 2011, India confirmed that it will support a Palestinian bid for membership of the United Nations at a meeting of the General Assembly.

Iran 

Iranian-Arab relations have always been very mixed. Within the Middle East historical conflicts have always colored neighboring Arab countries' perceptions about Iran. At times peacefully coexisting, while at other times in bitter conflict. North African Arabs from have for the larger part enjoyed closer relations with Iran due to limited historical connection between them and Iran.

Israel 

Only five Arab states in the region recognize the State of Israel: Bahrain, Jordan and the United Arab Emirates, as well as the State of Palestine.
After the 2008–09 Gaza War, the League of Arab States countries had suspended their relations with Israel.

Pakistan

China 

The recent economic boom in the People's Republic of China has led to an increased demand for oil and other raw petroleum products, much of which has been supplied by member states of the Arab League. Chinese-Arab relations in the past few years have increased with the institution of several Arab-Chinese business forums, conferences and meetings to increase trade and cooperation in recent years. China is the second-largest financial investor in Sudan following the other members of the Arab League, and as a result a majority of Sudan's production of petroleum is sent overseas to China. Foreign ties have also been made with the Arab League states of Morocco, Algeria, Egypt, Iraq and Syria in order to further invest in petroleum production in the Middle East and North Africa.

As of 2008, the Arab League and the People's Republic of China have agreed to create an annual forum between the two parties in order to discuss matters of economics, trade and environmental studies. In 2009, the forum was expanded to also include the discussion of various nuclear projects.

Russia

Arab Russian relations go back to the Khazars and their wars with the Arab Empire, but has flourished most under the Soviet Union, with the Communist Union of Soviet Socialist Republics' support for several Socialist Arab regimes against the Capitalist United States during the cold war, regimes like Nasser's Egypt and the Baathist regimes of Syria and Iraq, as well as other Socialist regimes in Libya and South Yemen.

After the end of the cold war and the establishment of the Russia Federation, new ties have been made. Russia with its strong diplomatic relations with Arab States from the Soviet Era, is trying to regain its strength by supporting their causes, especially in the Security Council.

Turkey 

Turkey has a historical connection dated back from the Ottoman Empire, and it is also complicated due to historical reasons. Turkey has expressed desires for an observer status in the League, but has been refused for several political reasons. One of the reasons for refusals came from Iraq and Syria due to the Turkish Water Projects on the Tigris and Euphrates rivers, especially the Atatürk Dam. Also the Hatay Province's choice of self-annexation to Turkey in 1939 was never recognized by Syria, which continues to show the Hatay Province of Turkey as part of Syria's territory in its maps.

Today, Turkey has improved relations with Egypt, Saudi Arabia, the United Arab Emirates, and Tunisia. It also functions as the main broker in the Israeli-Syrian peace process. However, a primary concern for Turkey stems from the possibility of an independent Kurdish state arising from a destabilized Iraq. Turkey is currently fighting a war against Kurdish insurgents on its own soil, in which an estimated 37,000 people have lost their lives.

United States 

The United States' relationship with the Arab World prior to the Second World War was limited. Moreover, in comparison to European powers such as Britain and France which had managed to colonize almost all of the Arab World after defeating the Ottoman Empire in 1918, the United States was popular and respected among the Arabs, for having brought modern medicine, and setting up educational institutions in several Arab nations. The US had also provided the Arab World with highly skilled petroleum engineers. Thus, there were some connections which were made between the United States and the Arab World, before the Second World War. Other examples of corporations between the US and the Arab World are the Red Line Agreement signed in 1928 and the Anglo-American Petroleum Agreement signed in 1944. Both of these agreements were legally binding and reflected an American interest in control of Arab and Middle Eastern energy resources, namely oil, and moreover reflected an American security imperative to prevent the (re)emergence of a powerful regional rival. The Red Line Agreement had been part of a network of agreements made in the 1920s to restrict supply of petroleum and ensure that the major [mostly American] companies...could control oil prices on world markets. The Red Line agreement governed the development of Arab oil for the next two decades. The Anglo-American Petroleum Agreement of 1944 was based on negotiations between the United States and Britain over the control of Arab and Middle Eastern oil.

Uzbekistan 

Arab League relations with Uzbekistan have been almost nonexistent until 2007. Then the Arab League Secretary General Amr Moussa and the Uzbek president Islam Karimov have met to carry on discussions held previously in Cairo, for more Arab cooperation with Central Asia and more Central Asian support for Arab causes, such as Iraq, Sudan and Palestine.

References

External links 
 

 
Arab League